Good Scouts is a 1938 American animated short film produced by Walt Disney Productions and released by RKO Radio Pictures. The cartoon follows Donald Duck leading his nephews Huey, Dewey, and Louie on a scouting trip through the wilderness. It was directed by Jack King and features Clarence Nash as Donald and the three nephews.

Good Scouts was nominated for an Academy Award for Best Animated Short Film at the 11th Academy Awards in 1939, but lost to Disney's own Ferdinand the Bull. Also nominated that year from Disney were Brave Little Tailor and Mother Goose Goes Hollywood, setting the record for most nominations in the category for one studio. Good Scouts was the first Academy Award nomination for the Donald Duck series.

Plot
Donald Duck and his nephews Huey, Dewey, and Louie are both scouts on a scouting expedition at Yellowstone National Park, with Donald acting as the Scoutmaster. The ducks march along in military style singing "Polly Wolly Doodle." Arriving at their camp site, Donald unsuccessfully tries to teach the boys wilderness skills. He tries to chop down a petrified tree and pitch a tent with bad knots causing the nephews to laugh at his mistakes.

Frustrated at the nephews' lack of gratitude for his efforts, Donald decides to make them sorry by pretending to have been injured, pouring ketchup over himself. The dutiful nephews obviously fall for this, mistaking it for blood and immediately spring into action and quickly bandage Donald from head to toe. Donald is then unable to see and wanders aimlessly, eventually falling into a honey jar.

A large grizzly bear soon arrives having been attracted by the smell of food. Trying to escape the bear, Donald runs off a cliff and falls onto "Old Reliable Geyser" and gets his rear end stuck in the opening of the geyser. The water shoots Donald into the air, bringing him closer to the bear who is still above at the cliff's edge.

The nephews try to save Donald by plugging the geyser with a long log and then with three stones, all of which prove unsuccessful. They finally roll a large boulder over it, but the geyser is only stopped momentarily before bursting again, with the water shooting Donald and the boulder up to the same level of the cliff, allowing the bear to jump on top of the boulder to chase Donald, with the boulder rotating under their feet, perfectly balanced on top of the continuous stream of water from the geyser. By nighttime, the chase is still ongoing, and the nephews, having exhausted their means of rescuing their uncle, bed down in their tent for the night, bidding him good night.

Character development

Good Scouts was the second animated appearance of Huey, Dewey, and Louie, who had first appeared in the Donald Duck comics, and marked a significant change in their behavior. In their earlier appearances, the triplets were mischievous and caused a lot of trouble for Donald. But in Good Scouts the boys seem to have matured a great deal. They are shown as being resourceful, using teamwork, and generally trying to help Donald out of trouble. Although the boys are seen as mischievous in several later appearances, it was this more helpful characterization which would become more characteristic of them, in particular the classical comics written and drawn by Carl Barks. Barks would also often portray the triplets as members of the Junior Woodchucks, a fictional scout movement (albeit not with Donald as a scoutmaster).

The film was also the first to show Donald in a leadership role. In earlier appearances he was "someone just trying to go about his business and getting interrupted and irritated by others." As such, the film was an influence on later films such as Sea Scouts (1939) and Home Defense (1943).

Promotion
On July 8, 1938, The Film Daily printed an item about the Disney Studio's promotion of the cartoon: "With the release of "Good Scouts," a Disney with Donald Duck and his three nephews on high adventure in Yellowstone National Park... lookit!... a drawing of Donald and his nephews in Boy Scout uniform was presented to Dr. West, Chief Scout Executive, and an 8x10 print for each of a thousand Scout executives throughout the nation... publicity releases to 5,400 newspapers... reproduction of drawing in current Boys' Life and Scouting mags... stories in scout magazines... Scout tie-ups with theaters... notification of coming Disney one-reeler to 38,000 Scoutmasters... all this might well be called major league promotion... and on a short!"

Voice cast
 Clarence Nash: Donald Duck, Huey, Dewey and Louie

Releases
1938 – Theatrical release
1956 – Disneyland, #2.18: "A Day in the Life of Donald Duck" (TV)
1961 – Walt Disney's Wonderful World of Color, #8.11: "Kids is Kids" (TV)
1965 – Donald Duck Goes West (theatrical)
c. 1983 – Good Morning, Mickey!, episode #69 (TV)
c. 1992 – Donald's Quack Attack, episode #61 (TV)
1997 – The Ink and Paint Club, episode #1.20: "Huey, Dewey and Louie" (TV)

Home media
The short was released on May 18, 2004 on Walt Disney Treasures: The Chronological Donald, Volume One: 1934-1941.

Additional releases include:
1981 – "Kids is Kids Starring Donald Duck" (VHS)
2005 – "Classic Cartoon Favorites: Extreme Adventure Fun" (DVD)
2011 – iTunes (digital download)

See also
Good Scout Award
Junior Woodchucks

References

External links
 
 
 
 Good Scouts at The Encyclopedia of Animated Disney Shorts

1930s color films
Donald Duck short films
1930s Disney animated short films
Scouting in popular culture
1938 animated films
1938 short films
1938 films
Films directed by Jack King
Films produced by Walt Disney
American black-and-white films
Films scored by Oliver Wallace
Films with screenplays by Carl Barks
1930s American films
Films set in the Yellowstone National Park